Clinopodium mimuloides is a species of flowering plant in the mint family known by the common name monkeyflower savory. It is endemic to California.

The plant can be found from the Santa Lucia Mountains to the San Gabriel Mountains in Central California and Southern California. It grows in chaparral, and woodlands, and other local habitats.

Description
The slender branches are hairy, the herbage aromatic. The leaves have toothed or wavy edges and are up to 8 centimeters long by 6 wide.

Flowers occur in the leaf axils. Each is tubular and may be over 3 centimeters long. The flowers are salmon pink in color, and as the plant's name suggests, resemble those of some Mimulus species.

References

External links
 Calflora Database: Clinopodium mimuloides (Monkeyflower savory)
 Jepson Manual eFlora (TJM2) treatment - Clinopodium mimuloides
 USDA Plants Profile for Clinopodium mimuloides
 U.C. CalPhoto gallery of Clinopodium mimuloides (monkeyflower savory)

mimuloides
Flora of California
Flora of Baja California
Natural history of the California chaparral and woodlands
Natural history of the Peninsular Ranges
Natural history of the Transverse Ranges
Natural history of Los Angeles County, California
Natural history of San Diego County, California
~
Taxa named by George Bentham
Taxa named by Carl Sigismund Kunth
Flora without expected TNC conservation status